Love Sign (foaled April 19, 1977 in Virginia) was an American Thoroughbred racemare who won three Grade I races while competing against exceptionally strong female competition such as Hall of Fame inductees Genuine Risk and Bold 'n Determined.

Breeding
Love Sign was bred by Jane Wilbur Clark and raced by her husband, Stephen Clark, Jr. She was trained by U.S. Racing Hall of Fame inductee, Sidney Watters, Jr.

Racing career
At age two, Love Sign met with little success but at age three in 1980 won five Graded stakes races including Grade I wins in the Alabama Stakes at Saratoga Race Course and the first of two straight  editions of the Beldame Stakes at Belmont Park. As a four-year-old Love Sign was still a top contender,  winning two Graded stakes plus her second Grade 1 Beldame. At age five in 1982, Love Sign won two more Graded stakes races before being retired to serve as a broodmare.

Broodmare
Although bred to the likes of Slew o' Gold and twice to U.S. Triple Crown Champion Seattle Slew, Love Sign's foals met with no success in racing.

References

1977 racehorse births
Thoroughbred family 1-n
Racehorses bred in Virginia
Racehorses trained in the United States
American Grade 1 Stakes winners